Amina Salum Ali (born 24 October 1956) is a Tanzanian politician. She is the African Union former Ambassador to the United States since 2007. Succeeded by Arikana Chihombori Quao who became the second African Union Ambassador to the United States of America in 2017. now is the she minister of trade and Industry in Zanzibar Government.

Early life 

She was educated at Lumumba Secondary School. She studied economics at the University of Delhi. She also has an MBA in marketing from the University of Pune.

Political career
In June 2015, she declared her candidacy for the presidency in the 2015 election.

References

External links
 
 Why Amina Salum Ali eyes union presidency, Daily News, June 2015.
 

1956 births
Living people
Chama Cha Mapinduzi politicians
Lumumba Secondary School alumni
Delhi University alumni
Savitribai Phule Pune University alumni
Tanzanian women ambassadors
Ambassadors of Tanzania to the United States
Tanzanian women diplomats
Zanzibari politicians
21st-century Tanzanian women politicians